Riltons Vänner (Rilton's Friends) is a Swedish professional a cappella group. The group was based in Stockholm and was formed in 1999. The band disbanded in July 2010 but reunited in May 2015.

The group has toured in Sweden as well as internationally.

Members
Linnéa Rilton (soprano)
Matilda Lindell (soprano)
Mia Greayer (alto)
Daniel Greayer (baritone)
Sebastian Rilton (bass)

Former members
Ida Carnestedt
Mathilda Lindgren (mezzo-soprano)

Discography
Kompis (2002)
Kamrat (2003)
Här är passion (2005)
De vill att vi bugar och niger (2008) 
Japanmix (2009)
Orkar, Orkar Inte (2019)

Awards

Winner, 2005 Best Folk/World Album of the Year, Contemporary A Cappella Society.

External links
 Riltons Vänner

Swedish musical groups
Professional a cappella groups